Billie Sunday Farnum (April 11, 1916 – November 18, 1979) was a politician from the U.S. state of Michigan. He served one term in the U.S. House of Representatives from 1965 to 1967.

Biography 
Farnum was born in Saginaw, Michigan and raised in a farm community at Watrousville. He was named after evangelist Billy Sunday.

He graduated from Vassar High School, Vassar, Michigan, in 1933 and continued his education in the Civilian Conservation Corps, 1933–1935. He took special educational courses and was employed in the automobile industry in Pontiac, 1936–1952.

He engaged in union activities ranging from shop steward to international representative for United Auto Workers-Congress of Industrial Organizations from 1942 to 1952. He was administrative aide to U.S. Senator Blair Moody, 1952–1954 and assistant Michigan Secretary of State, 1955–1957; deputy Michigan Secretary of State, 1957–1960; and Michigan Auditor General, 1961–1965. He was a delegate to the Democratic National Conventions of 1956, 1960, and 1964.

Congress 
Farnum was elected as a Democrat from Michigan's 19th congressional district to the 88th United States Congress, serving from January 3, 1965, to January 3, 1967. He  was an unsuccessful candidate for reelection in 1966, losing in the general election to Republican Jack McDonald. As a result,  he was described as one of the Michigan Five Fluke Freshmen, a group of first term Michigan Democrats in Congress who were defeated in 1966.

Later career and death 
Farnum was a deputy chairman of the Democratic National Committee from 1967 to 1968 and a member of the  Waterford Board of Education from 1969 to 1970. He owned a financial and management consulting firm. He was elected secretary of the Michigan Senate in 1975 and served in that capacity until his death in Lansing. He was entombed in a mausoleum at Deepdale Memorial Park.

The Michigan Senate's previous office building in Lansing was named after Farnum. In 2016, the Michigan Senate's office building was moved to the Connie Binsfield Building.

References

The Political Graveyard

1916 births
1979 deaths
Michigan Auditors General
American trade union leaders
Civilian Conservation Corps people
People from Tuscola County, Michigan
Politicians from Saginaw, Michigan
American Congregationalists
Democratic Party members of the United States House of Representatives from Michigan
20th-century American politicians